Nino Pavese (10 April 1904 – 21 December 1979) was an Italian actor and voice actor.

Biography
Born in Asti and the younger brother of actor and voice actor Luigi Pavese, he began his career on stage with a theatrical troupe in the early 1930s before moving on to cinema. Pavese appeared in over 49 films between 1936 and 1973. He  made his debut film appearance in the 1936 film The Two Sergeants directed by Enrico Guazzoni. Pavese was often typically cast as villains in dramatic or adventure films.

In addition to working as a screen actor, Pavese was also a popular dubbing artist. He usually dubbed the voices of James Cagney, Steve Cochran, Albert Dekker, Bruce Cabot, Anthony Caruso, Conrad Veidt, and many more in most of their films. He also dubbed his brother’s voice in the 1954 film Farewell, My Beautiful Lady. In his animated roles, Pavese voiced George Darling in the Italian dub of Peter Pan.

Pavese married Jolanda Peghin in 1930. Their daughter Paila is also a voice actress.

Selected filmography

 I due sergenti  (1936)
 Antonio Meucci (1940)
 La fanciulla di Portici (1940)
 Il pirata sono io! (1940)
 Non me lo dire!  (1940)
 Abandonment (1940)
 Antonio Meucci (1940)
 Pirates of Malaya (1941)
The King of England Will Not Pay (1941)
 Blood Wedding (1941)
 Il fanciullo del West (1942)
 Oro nero (1942)
 Labbra serrate (1942)
 Tempesta sul golfo (1943)
 Il nostro prossimo (1943)
 A Little Wife (1943)
 Non mi muovo! (1943)
 Dagli Appennini alle Ande  (1943)
 La valle del diavolo (1943)
 Il sole di Montecassino (1945)
 Circo equestre Za-bum (1945)
 The Ten Commandments (1945)
 I Met You in Naples (1946)
 The Ways of Sin (1946)
 The Devil's Gondola (1946)
 The Tyrant of Padua (1946)
 Pian delle stelle (1946)
 The White Primrose (1947)
 The Mill on the Po (1948)
 Come scopersi l'America (1949)
 Anthony of Padua (1949)
 Una voce nel tuo cuore (1949)
 Il Brigante Musolino (1950)
 L'edera (1950)
 The Ungrateful Heart (1951)
 The Last Sentence (1951)
 Vedi Napoli e poi muori (1951)
 Maschera nera (1951)
 Arrivano i nostri (1951)
 Papà ti ricordo! (1952)
 Lieutenant Giorgio (1952)
 The Passaguai Family Gets Rich (1952)
 Il tallone d'Achille (1952)
 The Black Mask (1952)
 Serenata amara (1952)
 Siamo tutti inquilini (1953)
 La pattuglia dell'Amba Alagi (1953)
 Cento anni d'amore (1953)
 La grande avventura (1954)
 Piccola santa (1954)
 Non perdiamo la testa (1959)
 I piaceri del sabato notte (1960)
 Dieci italiani per un tedesco (1962)
 Sono stato io (1973)

References

External links

1904 births
1979 deaths
People from Asti
Italian male film actors
Italian male voice actors
Italian male television actors
Italian male stage actors
Italian male radio actors
20th-century Italian male actors